Peabody Hall is a building on the University of Arkansas campus in Fayetteville, Arkansas. The 1913 structure is a contributing property to the University of Arkansas Campus Historic District, which is listed on the National Register of Historic Places. Peabody Hall has continuously housed the teacher education department since completion in 1913. Today, the department is part of the University of Arkansas College of Education and Health Professions. It was built using private funds from George Peabody, one of the fathers of modern philanthropy.

See also
 University of Arkansas Campus Historic District

References

National Register of Historic Places in Fayetteville, Arkansas
University and college buildings completed in 1913
1913 establishments in Arkansas
University of Arkansas buildings
University of Arkansas